The cochoas (from cocho, Nepali for Cochoa purpurea) are medium-sized frugivorous, insectivorous and molluscivorous birds in the genus Cochoa. Their bright contrasting plumage patterns, sexual dimorphism and feeding habits made their systematic position difficult to ascertain in early times, Richard Bowdler Sharpe placed them with the Prionopidae in 1879 while many considered them as some kind of aberrant thrush. The genus was previously included in the Old World flycatcher family Muscicapidae but molecular phylogenetic studies have shown that it is more closely related to the thrush family Turdidae.

Species
These are southeast Asian forest-dwelling species, often found near water.
The genus contains the following species:

References

 
Bird genera